Leonhard Heinrich Kass (22 October 1911 – 23 November 1985) was an Estonian football player who played as a left winger. He won the Estonian Championship eight times and the Estonian Cup twice.

Internationally, Kass made 40 appearances for the Estonia national football team since his debut in 1931, and scored 8 goals. He won the 1931 and the 1938 Baltic Cup with the team.

Honours

Club
Sport
 Estonian Championship: 1931, 1932, 1933

Estonia
 Estonian Championship: 1938–39

Dünamo
 Estonian Championship: 1945, 1947, 1949, 1950
 Estonian Cup: 1946, 1947

Country
Estonia
 Baltic Cup: 1931, 1938

References

1911 births
1985 deaths
Footballers from Tallinn
People from the Governorate of Estonia
Estonian footballers
Estonia international footballers
Association football wingers
JK Dünamo Tallinn players